Vallcarca station may refer to:

Vallcarca metro station, a metro station in the city of Barcelona, Catalonia, Spain
Vallcarca railway station, a former railway station in the abandoned coastal settlement of Vallcarca, Sitges, Catalonia, Spain